Velké Hydčice is a municipality and village in Klatovy District in the Plzeň Region of the Czech Republic. It has about 300 inhabitants. The historic centre of the village is well preserved and is protected by law as a village monument zone.

History
The first written mention of Velké Hydčice is from 1045, when it was property of the Břevnov Monastery.

References

Villages in Klatovy District